Irvine station may refer to:
Irvine Transportation Center, an Amtrak and Metrolink station in Irvine, California
Irvine railway station, a National Rail station in Irvine, Scotland
Irvine Bank Street railway station, a former station in Irvine, Scotland